Jānis Elsiņš (born 7 February 1974) is a Latvian bobsledder. He competed in the two man and the four man events at the 1998 Winter Olympics.

References

External links
 

1974 births
Living people
Latvian male bobsledders
Olympic bobsledders of Latvia
Bobsledders at the 1998 Winter Olympics
People from Sigulda
20th-century Latvian people